The Beast from 20,000 Fathoms is a 1953 American science fiction monster film directed by Eugène Lourié, with special effects by Ray Harryhausen. The film stars Paul Christian, Paula Raymond, Cecil Kellaway, and Kenneth Tobey. The screenplay is based on Ray Bradbury's 1951 short story "The Fog Horn", specifically the scene where a lighthouse is destroyed by the title character.

The film's story concerns a fictional dinosaur, the Rhedosaurus, which is released from its frozen hibernating state by an atomic bomb test in the Arctic Circle. The beast begins to wreak a path of destruction as it travels southward, eventually arriving at its ancient spawning grounds, which includes New York City.

The Beast from 20,000 Fathoms was one of the early atomic monster movies, and it helped inspire a generation of creature features and directly inspired Godzilla.

Plot 

Far north of the Arctic Circle, a nuclear bomb test, dubbed "Operation Experiment", is conducted. Prophetically, right after the blast, physicist Thomas Nesbitt muses "What the cumulative effects of all these atomic explosions and tests will be, only time will tell". Nesbitt is the only surviving witness to the beast's awakening and later is dismissed out-of-hand as being delirious at the time of his sighting. Despite the skepticism, he persists, knowing what he saw.

The dinosaur begins making its way down the east coast of North America, sinking a fishing ketch off the Grand Banks, destroying another near Marquette, Canada, wrecking a lighthouse in Maine and destroying buildings in Massachusetts. Nesbitt eventually gains allies in paleontologist Thurgood Elson and his young assistant Lee Hunter after one of the surviving fishermen identifies from a collection of drawings the very same dinosaur that Nesbitt saw. Plotting the sightings of the beast's appearances on a map for skeptical military officers, Elson proposes the dinosaur is returning to the Hudson River area, where fossils of Rhedosaurus were first found. In a diving bell search of the undersea Hudson River Canyon, Professor Elson is killed after his bell is swallowed by the beast, which eventually comes ashore in Manhattan. It eats a police officer shooting at it, squashes cars, knocks over buildings and generally causes panic and havoc.  A later newspaper report of its rampage lists "180 known dead, 1500 injured, damage estimates $300 million".

Meanwhile, military troops led by Colonel Jack Evans attempt to stop the Rhedosaurus with an electrified barricade, then blast a hole with a bazooka in the beast's throat, which drives it back into the sea. Unfortunately, it bleeds all over the streets of New York, unleashing a horrible, virulent prehistoric contagion, which begins to infect the populace, causing even more fatalities. The infection precludes blowing up the Rhedosaurus or even setting it ablaze, lest the contagion spread further. It is decided to shoot a radioactive isotope into the beast's neck wound with hopes of burning it from the inside, while at the same time neutralizing the contagion.

When the Rhedosaurus comes ashore and reaches the Coney Island amusement park, military sharpshooter Corporal Stone takes a rifle grenade loaded with a potent radioactive isotope and along with Dr. Nesbitt climbs on board the Coney Island Cyclone roller coaster. Riding the coaster to the top of the tracks, so he can get to eye-level with the beast, he fires the isotope into its open neck wound. It thrashes about in reaction, causing the roller coaster to spark when falling to the ground, setting the amusement park ablaze. With the fire spreading rapidly, Nesbitt and Stone climb down as the park becomes engulfed in flames. The Rhedosaurus collapses and eventually dies from the isotope's radiation poisoning.

Cast 
 Paul Christian as Professor Tom Nesbitt
 Paula Raymond as Lee Hunter
 Cecil Kellaway as Dr. Thurgood Elson
 Kenneth Tobey as Colonel Jack Evans
 Donald Woods as Captain Phil Jackson
 Ross Elliott as George Ritchie
 Steve Brodie as Sgt. Loomis
 Jack Pennick as Jacob Bowman
 Michael Fox as ER doctor
 Lee Van Cleef as Corporal Jason Stone
 Frank Ferguson as Dr. Morton
 King Donovan as Dr. Ingersoll
 James Best as Charlie, radar operator

Production 

The Beast from 20,000 Fathoms had a production budget of $200,000.

The film was announced in the trades as The Monster from Beneath the Sea. During preproduction in 1951, Ray Harryhausen brought to Dietz and Chester's attention that Ray Bradbury had just published a short story in The Saturday Evening Post titled "The Beast from 20,000 Fathoms" (it was later anthologized under the title "The Fog Horn"). This story was about a marine-based prehistoric dinosaur that destroys a lighthouse. A similar sequence appeared in the draft script of The Monster from Beneath the Sea. The producers, wishing to share in Bradbury's reputation and popularity, promptly bought the rights to his story and changed the film's title to match the story's title. Bradbury's name was used extensively in the promotional campaign. It also had an on-screen credit that read "Suggested by the Saturday Evening Post Story by Ray Bradbury".

An original music score was composed by Michel Michelet, but when Warner Bros. purchased the film, it had a new score written by David Buttolph. Ray Harryhausen had been hoping that his film music hero Max Steiner, under contract at the time with Warner Bros., would write the film score. Steiner had written the landmark score for RKO's King Kong in 1933. Unfortunately for Harryhausen, Steiner had too many commitments, but Buttolph composed one of his more memorable and powerful scores, setting much of the tone for giant monster film music of the 1950s.

Some early pre-production conceptual sketches of the Beast showed that, at one point, it was to have a shelled head and later was to have a beak. Creature effects were assigned to Ray Harryhausen, who had been working for years with Willis O'Brien, the man who created King Kong. The film monster looks nothing like the Brontosaurus-type creature of the short story. It is instead a kind of Tyrannosaurus-type prehistoric predator, though quadrupedal in stature. The monster was unlike any real carnivorous dinosaur and more closely resembled a rauisuchian. A drawing of the creature was published along with the story in The Saturday Evening Post. At one point, there were plans to have the Beast snort flames, but this idea was dropped before production began due to budget restrictions. The concept, however, was used for the film poster. Later, the creature's nuclear flame breath was the inspiration for the original Japanese film Godzilla (1954).

In a scene attempting to identify the Rhedosaurus, Professor Tom Nesbitt rifles through dinosaur drawings by Charles R. Knight, a man whom Harryhausen claimed as an inspiration.

The dinosaur skeleton in the museum sequence is artificial; it was obtained from RKO Pictures' prop storage where it had been constructed for its classic comedy Bringing Up Baby (1938).

The climactic roller coaster live-action scenes were filmed on location at the Pike in Long Beach, California and featured the Cyclone Racer entrance ramp, ticket booth, loading platform and beach views of the structure. Split-matte, in-camera special effects by Harryhausen effectively combined the live action of the actors and the roller coaster background footage from the Pike's parking lot with the stop-motion animation of the Beast's destroying a shooting miniature of the coaster.

Release 

Warner Bros. acquired the film for $800,000 (including a large advertising campaign) and released it on June 13, 1953 in New York and Los Angeles. The film had one of the widest and fastest release of the time, planning to have most of its bookings in its first two months, opening in 1,422 theaters nationwide within the first week. Original prints of Beast were sepia toned.

Critical reception 

In his review of The Beast from 20,000 Fathoms for The New York Times, A. H. Weiler was not impressed with the story: "And though the sight of the gigantic monster rampaging through such areas as Wall Street and Coney Island sends the comparatively ant-like humans on the screen scurrying away in an understandable tizzy, none of the customers in the theater seemed to be making for the hills. On sober second thought, however, this might have been sensible".

Hy Hollinger's review in Variety focused more on the impressive special effects: "Producers have created a prehistoric monster that makes Kong seem like a chimpanzee. It's a gigantic amphibious beast that towers above some of New York's highest buildings. The sight of the beast stalking through Gotham's downtown streets is awesome. Special credit should go to Ray Harryhausen for the socko technical effects". Our Culture Mag critic Christopher Stewardson rated the film 3.5 out of 5.

Rotten Tomatoes retrospectively collected 21 reviews and gives the film a 90% approval rating, with an average rating of 6.60/10.

Box office 
The film earned $2.25 million at the North American box office during its first year of release and grossed more than $5 million.

Legacy 
The Beast from 20,000 Fathoms was the first live-action film to feature a giant monster awakened/brought about by an atomic bomb detonation, preceding Godzilla by 16 months. During the production of Godzilla, its pre-published story was very similar to The Beast from 20,000 Fathoms and was titled . As above-mentioned, the Rhedosaurus was originally planned to breathe "atomic flame" similar to Godzilla's atomic heat beam. The film's financial success helped spawn the genre of giant monster films of the 1950s. Producers Jack Dietz and Hal E. Chester got the idea to combine the growing paranoia about nuclear weapons with the concept of a giant monster after a successful theatrical re-release of King Kong. In turn, this craze included Them! the following year about a colony of giant ants (the first of the "big bug" films of the 1950s), the Godzilla series from Japan that has spawned films from 1954 to the present day, and two British features directed by Beast director Eugène Lourié, Behemoth, the Sea Monster (U.K. 1959, U.S. release retitled The Giant Behemoth) and Gorgo (U.K. 1961). Harryhausen himself admitted the extensive similarities with his work and Godzilla in an interview regarding Peter Jackson's King Kong in 2005 and expressed a bitterness towards the Japanese series. Harryhausen would later reuse the Rhedosaurus model to portray the dragon in the 1958 film The 7th Voyage of Sinbad. Additionally, Harryhausen's baby Allosaurus within the 1966 movie One Million Years B.C. was followed by Toho's Gorosaurus in the 1967 movie King Kong Escapes where both theropods were grey-blue colored man-eaters and surviving descendants of Allosaurus, and giant snakes and apes or ape-men appeared in both films.

The movie Cloverfield (2008), which also involves a giant monster terrorizing New York City, inserts a frame from The Beast from 20,000 Fathoms (along with frames from King Kong and Them!) into the hand-held camera footage used throughout the film.

The Beast from 20,000 Fathoms was nominated for AFI's Top 10 Science Fiction Films list.

See also 
 The Arctic Giant (another case of similar monster film predating Toho's Godzilla)
 The 7th Voyage of Sinbad (parts of the Rhedosaurus's model was reused for the dragon which appears in the film)
 List of American films of 1953
 List of stop-motion films
 List of films featuring giant monsters

References

Notes

Bibliography 

 
 
 
 
 
 Warren, Bill. Keep Watching the Skies! American Science Fiction Films of the Fifties: 21st Century Edition. 2009. Jefferson, North Carolina: McFarland & Company (first editions Vol. 1, 1982, Vol. 2, 1986). .

External links 

 
 
 
 
 Rerecording of The Beast from 20,000 Fathoms soundtrack

1953 films
1950s fantasy films
1950s monster movies
1950s science fiction horror films
American black-and-white films
American monster movies
Films based on works by Ray Bradbury
American natural horror films
1950s English-language films
Films about dinosaurs
Giant monster films
Films based on science fiction short stories
Films directed by Eugène Lourié
Films scored by David Buttolph
Films set in amusement parks
Films set in New York City
Films shot in New York City
Films shot in Los Angeles
Films using stop-motion animation
Warner Bros. films
American science fiction horror films
1950s American films